Piantedosi is a surname. Notable people with the surname include:

 Gary Piantedosi (born 1954), American rower
 Matteo Piantedosi (born 1963), Italian civil servant and politician

See also
 Piantadosi, surname

Italian-language surnames